The  Kingdom of the Banyakitara, also known as Union of Kitara (Union of Chwezi) or Chwezi Union and better known as the Kitara Empire, was an empire in East Africa. It existed in the great lakes region from around the early bronze age to about 500 C.E. During its growth under the mysterious Chwezi Kings., the (Empire of the sun, Empire of the moon) ruled much of the Nile valley and beyond during its peak., when the Kingdom of Aksum disintegrated around 940 AD into the kingdom of Makuria, Zagwe dynasty, Kingdom of Damot (D`mt) and Sultanate of Shewa (Makhzumi dynasty) another kingdom split (broke) away in the south to form the Great Empire of kitara., the empire encompassed of what is modern day Uganda, Eastern Kenya, eastern D.R. Congo, Rwanda, Burundi, Tanzania, Malawi, Zimbabwe and Zambia., the Google interface has been translated into Kitara in February 2010 by the Faculty of Computing and IT, Makerere University. It is also used in the Orumuri newspaper, published by New Vision Group.

History
According to oral traditions of western Uganda, the Kitara empire naturally known as the Empire of the sun, Empire of the Moon disintegrated during the 14th-15th centuries, and broke up into new autonomous kingdoms ruled by descendants of the Chwezi who, by oral legend, mysteriously vanished without a trace. The new kingdoms included Bunyoro, Tooro, Ankole, Buganda, Busoga in Uganda, the Kingdom of Rwanda, Burundi, and Karagwe in northern Tanzania and others in the eastern Democratic Republic of Congo. Kitara was reported to have been ruled by two dynasties, the Batembuzi gods and their successors the Bachwezi god-kings. The Chwezi dynasty is thought to have been related to a Tembuzi king Ngonzaki's son Isaza. Isaza is believed to have been the last ruler of the Batembuzi dynasty, he married Nyamata, the daughter of Nyamiyonga , "King of the underworld". This union produced king Isimbwa who later fathered Ndahura in Runyakitara (known in Rwanda as Ndahiro I Bamara and in Buganda as Wamala Ndawula), the first of the Chwezi dynastic kings. King Ngonzaki was son to King Bada. Bada was the son to Kakama (Kayima) whose father Hanga descended from the heavens.

Rulers

Timeline
Preceded by:
 Kingdom of Aksum
 Kingdom of Damot
 Karagwe Kingdom
 Zagwe kingdom
 Shewa Kingdom
 Kingdom of Kush
 Kingdom of Makuria
Succeeded by:
 Bunyoro kingdom
 Buganda kingdom
 Tooro Kingdom
 Busoga kingdom 
 Ankole kingdom
 Kingdom of Rwenzururu
 Kingdom of Rwanda
 Kingdom of Burundi

Etymology

Pronunciation
 IPA(key): /ˈt͡ʃweɪzi/
 Rhymes: -eɪzi
 IPA(key): /ˈkitɑrɑ/, [ˈkit̪ɑrɑ]
 Rhymes: -itɑrɑ
 Syllabification(key): ki‧ta‧ra

Noun

Chwezi (plural only)
 A legendary African dynasty said to have ruled the Kitara empire.

Kitara can refer to:

 Kitara, the nickname for the Sapporo Concert Hall.
 Empire of Kitara, an East African empire founded by the dynasty of the Bachwezi.
 Kingdom of Bunyoro-Kitara, an East African kingdom founded by the dynasty of the  Babiito.
 Misa Kitara, a guitar-shaped touchpad MIDI controller and musical instrument.
 Runyakitara, a standardized language in Uganda.

See also
 African Empires
 African historiography
 History of Africa
 History of East Africa
 History of Uganda
 List of kingdoms in pre-colonial Africa
 Solomonic dynasty

References

External links 
 
 
 
 Organization & Mystification in an African Kingdom
 
 
 
 
 
 P6 Materials | PDF | East Africa | Archaeology
 
Uganda Bantu Languages
PanAfrican L10n page

Former monarchies of Africa
Precolonial Tanzania
History of Uganda
Former countries in Africa
Languages of Uganda

Constructed languages
Former empires